The men's shot put at the 2019 World Athletics Championships was held at the Khalifa International Stadium in Doha from 3 to 5 October 2019.

Summary
It took 20.90 to automatically qualify.  Exactly 12 men made that distance, eight of them on their first attempt.  There were no further place qualifiers to the final.

This was the cap to a build up of several strong athletes.  Four members of the 74 foot club were here, with Darlan Romani joining in 2019 and Ryan Crouser improving his personal best to #6 all time.  Behind them were four more men over 22 metres in the last two seasons.

With 22 metres the standard, the first throw of the competition was 22.36m by Crouser.  Three throws later, Romani moved into second with a 21.61m.  As the last thrower throughout the competition, Tomas Walsh launched a new Oceana continental record .  It was the longest throw in 29 years, making him the #4 thrower in history.  On his second throw, Romani threw 22.53m, just short of 74 feet, which put him into second place.  Crouser duplicated his first throw in the third.  It took 21.18m just to get three more throws.

In the fourth round, Joe Kovacs threw 21.95m to move into fourth, then Crouser threw 22.71m to move into second place. In the fifth round, Walsh landed his second best throw, 22.56m.

In the final round, Kovacs stepped into the ring and tossed it , equalling Alessandro Andrei for the #3 thrower in history.  More importantly, he took the lead.  A couple of throws later, Crouser stepped in to throw his best  to tie Walsh.  Walsh fouled again.  With his 22.71m second best throw, compared to 22.56m for Walsh, Crouser took second.  In the space of 5 minutes, Walsh went from the #4 thrower in history, to third place in the competition. Romani's best throw of 22.53m would have been good enough to win the gold medal in every World and Olympic shot put competition prior to this championship, however it was not enough to secure even the bronze here as he finished in 4th place.

This has been called the greatest shot put competition in history.

Records
Before the competition records were as follows:

The following records were established during the competition:

Qualification standard
The standard to qualify automatically for entry was 20.70 m.

Schedule
The event schedule, in local time (UTC+3), was as follows:

Results

Qualification
Qualification: Qualifying Performance 20.90 (Q) or at least 12 best performers (q) advanced to the final.

Final
The final was started on 5 October at 20:05.

References

Shot put
Shot put at the World Athletics Championships